Viola High School is a comprehensive public high school located in Viola, Arkansas, United States. It is one of three public high schools in Fulton County and the sole high school administered by Viola School District. For the 2010–11 school year, the school provides secondary education for approximately 200 students in grades 7 through 12 and employs more than 18 educators.

Academics 
The assumed course of study for Viola students follows the SMART Core curriculum developed by the Arkansas Department of Education (ADE), which requires students to complete 22 units prior to graduation. Students complete regular coursework and exams and may elect to take Advanced Placement (AP) courses and exams with the opportunity for college credit. The school is accredited by the ADE.  The school also offers online concurrent credit courses in partnership with Ozarka College.

Athletics 
The Viola High School athletic emblem and mascot is the Longhorn with black and orange serving as the school colors.

The Viola Longhorns compete in interscholastic activities within the 1A Classification—the state's smallest classification—via the 1A Region 2 Conference administered by the Arkansas Activities Association. The Longhorns compete in golf (boys), basketball (boys/girls), baseball, softball, and cross country (boys/girls).

 Basketball: The girls basketball team are 2-time state basketball champions (1959, 1961). The boys basketball team equaled that mark and are 2-time state basketball champions with wins in 1957 and 2002.
 Baseball: The baseball team is 2-time List of Arkansas state high school baseball champions (1998, 1999).

Notable alumni

 Preacher Roe - Former MLB Player (St. Louis Cardinals, Pittsburgh Pirates, Brooklyn Dodgers)

References

External links 
 

Public high schools in Arkansas
Schools in Fulton County, Arkansas